"I Just Wanna Shine" is a song by American indie pop band Fitz and the Tantrums. It was released on July 14, 2019, as the fourth single from the band's fourth studio album All the Feels. Band's members Michael Fitzpatrick, Noelle Scaggs, Joe Karnes, James King, Jeremy Ruzumna and John Wicks wrote the song with Nick Long, and it was produced by Jake Sinclair.

The song is used for promos advertising the weekday morning news for WABC-TV.

Music video
An accompanying music video was released on July 15, 2019. The video shows young skateboarding breakdancer "practicing her craft" at different locations of Los Angeles, finally "culminating on the rooftop of her apartment building with the city’s skyline behind her."

Track listing

Credits and personnel
Credits adapted from AllMusic.

 Suzy Chin – Engineer
 Fitz and the Tantrums – composer, keyboards, primary artist, vocals, 
 Joe Karnes – bass
 Joseph Karnes – composer
 James King – composer, horn
 Nick Long – composer, guitar
 Michelle Mancini – mastering
 Manny Marroquin – mixing
 Jeremy Ruzumna – composer, keyboards
 Noelle Scaggs – composer, vocals
 Jake Sinclair – producer
 Rachel White – assistant engineer
 John Wicks – composer, drums

Charts

Weekly charts

Year-end charts

References

2019 singles
2019 songs
Fitz and The Tantrums songs
Elektra Records singles